Whymper may refer to:
 Edward Whymper (1840–1911), English mountaineer and explorer
 Frederick Whymper (1838–1901), English artist and explorer
 Frederick Whymper (cricketer) (1827–1893), English cricketer and factory inspector
 Josiah Wood Whymper (1813–1903), English wood-engraver and water-colourist
 Mr. Whymper, a human character in George Orwell's Animal Farm

Other uses
 Mount Whymper (disambiguation), two separate mountains in Canada
 Whymper Spur, Antarctic rock spur named for Edward Whymper
 Whymper tent, A-framed tent used in mountaineering, designed by Edward Whymper